The Bhopal–Bina Passenger is a passenger train of the Indian Railways, which runs between Bhopal Junction railway station of Bhopal, the capital city of Madhya Pradesh and Bina Junction railway station of Bina, in the Central Indian state Madhya Pradesh

Arrival and departure
Train no.51739 departs from Bhopal, daily at 10:20 hrs., reaching Bina the same day at 14:30 hrs.
Train no.61632 departs from Bina daily at 17:35 hrs.reaching Bhopal same day at 21:05 hrs.

Route and halts
The train goes via Vidisha. The important halts of the train are :
 Bhopal Junction
 Bhopal Nishatpura
 Bhopal Sukhsewanagar
 Bhopal Dewanganj
 Salamatpur
 Sanchi
 Vidisha
 Bareth
 Gulabganj
 Sumer
 Ganj Basoda
 Kalhar
 Mandi Bamora
 Kurwai Kethora
 Anokha Kurwai
 Bina Junction
 Bina Agasod
 Bina Etawa

Coach composite
The train consists of 18 coaches :
 1 First Class
 4 Sleeper coaches
 10 Unreserved
 1 Ladies/Handicapped
 2 Luggage/Brake van

Average speed and frequency
The train runs with an average speed of 35 km/h. The train runs on daily basis.

Loco link
The train is hauled by Ratlam ETA 22703-3 electrical engine.

Rake maintenance & sharing
The train is maintained by the Bhopal Coaching Depot. The same rake is used for five trains, which are:
Indore–Chhindwara Panchvalley Express
Indore–Maksi Fast Passenger
Indore–Ujjain Passenger
Bhopal–Indore Passenger
Bhopal–Ujjain Passenger for one way which is altered by the second rake on the other way.

Trivia
 This train is expected to extend up to Saugor with effect of new rail budget - 2011

See also
Vindhyachal Express
Indore Junction
Bhopal Junction

References

Transport in Bhopal
Railway services introduced in 1999
Rail transport in Madhya Pradesh
Slow and fast passenger trains in India